Frykberg is a Swedish surname. Notable people with the surname include:

Lasse Frykberg (born 1957), Swedish cross-country skier
Nils Frykberg (1888–1966), Swedish runner 
Susan Frykberg (born 1954), New Zealand electroacoustic composer and sound artist

Swedish-language surnames